The Kodak DC series was Kodak's pioneering consumer-grade line of digital cameras; as distinct from their much more expensive professional Kodak DCS series. Cameras in the DC series were manufactured and sold during the mid-to-late 1990s and early 2000s. Some were branded as "Digital Science".  Most of these early digital cameras supported RS-232 serial port connections because USB hardware was not widely available before 1998. Some models in the DC series ran on the short lived DigitaOS, a camera operating system that allowed third party software to be installed.

The DC series was superseded by the Kodak EasyShare camera line.

Kodak DC20 
The Kodak DC20 was an early digital camera first released by Kodak in 3 June 1996, in Australia at price of AU$560. It had a manufacturer's suggested retail price of US$299 when most other digital cameras at the time cost well over $1000. The DC20 only had the most basic features of a digital camera: It had no liquid crystal display (LCD) for reviewing pictures. It came with only 1 megabyte of internal flash memory, which could only store 8 or 16 images, depending on image quality, and did not support external flash memory. It had no built-in photo flash. Its CCD sensor had a maximum resolution of 493x373 pixels. It had a fixed focal length f/4 lens, equivalent to 47 mm for 35 mm single lens reflex film cameras.

With physical dimensions of 31 x 102 x 61 mm, the Kodak DC20 was the first ultracompact digital camera. Its sleek compact size would remain unrivaled until the release of the Canon Digital Ixus and Casio Exilim.

There were several add-on lenses released for the Kodak DC20. These included a macro adapter, a telephoto converter, and a wide-angle converter from Tiffen. These were clip-on lenses since the original lens had no thread. There was also an add-on photo flash unit made by Kodak.

Kodak DC25 
The Kodak DC25 was released about the same time as the Kodak DC20.  They used the same 493x373 pixel CCD sensor and 47 mm-equivalent lens. They also shared a similar form factor and shape. However the DC25 was considerably larger than the DC20 because it carried an LC display for picture review. Moreover, the Kodak DC25 was among the first cameras to have a PCMCIA slot to support CompactFlash cards for external storage.  It did not support the JPEG image file format, storing images in Kodak's proprietary K25 file format instead, as the JPEG image standard was very new and still under development at the time the camera was being designed.

Kodak DC40
Released in 1995, the DC40 shared its lineage with the Apple QuickTake 100, both of which were manufactured by Chinon. It came with fixed focal length lens of 42 mm-equivalent and a 768x512 pixel CCD sensor. It came with 4 megabyte of internal flash memory storage and did not have any capabilities for using external memory. It also did not have an LCD for picture display. The cost was $1,000.

Kodak DC50 
This early digital camera was essentially the same as the Chinon ES-3000, Dycam 10-C, Promaster Digital One, and Dakota DCC-9500; but with improved software, a higher resolution sensor, and a dark gray case. The Kodak DC50 featured a 3:1 zoom lens (37 mm to 111 mm-equivalent), built-in photo flash and a PCMCIA slot for Type I and II ATA cards. It came with a simple monochrome LCD to report basic camera statistics, but did not come with a graphical LCD for picture review. The Kodak DC50 had a 756x504 pixel color CCD sensor, just like the Kodak DC40. It only stored images in Kodak's proprietary KDC file format with 3 user-selectable quality levels.

Kodak DC120 
Released in 1997, the Kodak DC120 had a similar size and form factor as the DC40 and the DC50. Like the DC50, it also had a 3:1 zoom lens. However, it boasted a larger 1280x960 pixel CCD sensor and  built-in photo flash.  It had 2 megabytes of internal picture storage and supported CompactFlash external memory storage. It also had a color LCD for picture review.  It continued to use Kodak's KDC file format.  The camera had an optical viewfinder with dual target rings in the center to account for parallax over the zoom range.

The DC120 required 6 to 6.8 volts DC power, supplied by four AA-size 1.7 V lithium primary cells.  Although nickel-metal hydride (Ni-MH) 1.25 V or nickel-cadmium (Ni-Cd) 1.2 V cells could be used, due to their lower capacity and discharge characteristics they needed to be replaced frequently — every 20 to 30 pictures, or so.  Ordinary alkaline or carbon-zinc primary cells could be used for daylight photography and during storage to keep the camera's internal clock running and preserve settings, but they had excessive internal resistance and insufficient current capacity to power the camera when the photo flash was in use.  An optional external AC adapter could also be used, supplying 7-8 VDC via a coaxial power plug, for transferring pictures to a computer or for fixed use indoors.

Full model list

 DC10 — 0.? megapixel, 47 mm equivalent fixed lens
 DC20 — 0.2 megapixel, 47 mm equivalent fixed lens
 DC25 — 0.2 megapixel, 47 mm equivalent fixed lens, CompactFlash slot
 DC40 — 0.38 megapixel, 42 mm equivalent fixed lens
 DC50 — 0.38 megapixel, 37–111 mm equivalent lens, PCMCIA slot

 DC120 — 1 megapixel, 38–114 mm equivalent lens, CompactFlash slot

 DC200 — 1 megapixel, 39 mm equivalent fixed lens, CompactFlash slot

 DC200 Plus — 1 megapixel, 39 mm equivalent fixed lens, CompactFlash slot

 DC210 — 1 megapixel, 2x optical zoom lens, CompactFlash slot

 DC210 Plus — 1 megapixel, 2x optical zoom lens, CompactFlash slot

 DC215 — 1 megapixel, 2x zoom lens, CompactFlash slot

 DC220 — 1 megapixel, 29 mm to 58 mm equivalent lens, 2x zoom lens + 2x digital zoom, CompactFlash slot

 DC240 — 1.2 megapixels, 3x optical zoom + 2x digital zoom, CompactFlash slot, announced 26 Feb. 1999

 DC260 — 1.6 megapixels, 3x optical zoom + 2x digital zoom, CompactFlash slot

 DC265 — 1.6 megapixels, 3x optical zoom + 2x digital zoom, CompactFlash slot

 DC280 — 2 megapixels, 2x optical zoom + 3x digital zoom, CompactFlash slot

 DC290 — 2.1 megapixels, 3x optical zoom + 2x digital zoom, CompactFlash slot

 DC3200 — 1.3 megapixels, fixed lens, 2mb internal memory, CompactFlash slot

 DC3400 — 2 megapixels, 2x optical zoom + 3x digital zoom, CompactFlash slot

 DC3800 — 2.1 megapixels, 2x digital zoom (but only usable on lesser quality setting), CompactFlash slot

 DC4800 — 3.1 megapixels, 3x optical zoom + 1x digital zoom, CompactFlash slot

 DC5000 — 2 megapixels, 2x optical zoom + 3x digital zoom, CompactFlash slot, weatherproof rugged camera

References